Sanaa Bhambri (born 7 March 1988) is a former professional tennis player from India. Her highest doubles ranking is world No. 298, which she achieved October 2005. She won one $25k doubles event at Lagos, Nigeria in 2005 and competed in three WTA tournament main draws.

In her career, Bhambri won two singles titles and twelve doubles titles on the ITF Women's Circuit.

Career
A left-hander, Bhambri reached the semifinals of the 2003 French Open girls' doubles event, partnering fellow Indian Sania Mirza.

In October 2005, partnering Ankita Bhambri, Sanaa won a $25k event at Lagos. The sister tandem won both their semifinal and final matches by seeing their opponents withdraw before a point was played.

Her only WTA Tour main-draw appearances were at Kolkata at the Sunfeast Open, in each of the three years that the event was held – 2005, 2006 and 2007. Competing in doubles, Bhambri lost in the first round each time.

Active on tour from 2005 through 2010, competing primarily in events in India and Thailand, Bhambri won twelve $10k tournaments; two in singles (2006 in Ahmedabad and 2008 in Gurgaon) and ten in doubles.

Sanaa won a triple crown at the 2004 DSCL National Championships held in Delhi- in women's singles, women's doubles and girls' under-18s singles. She is the youngest Indian to achieve the feat.

Personal life
Bhambri's sister Ankita and brother Yuki all are or have been tour-level tennis players. She has cousins, Prerna Bhambri and Prateek Bhambri, who also play on the Indian circuit.

ITF Circuit finals

Singles: 6 (2–4)

Doubles: 23 (12–11)

References

External links
 
 

Living people
1988 births
Indian female tennis players
People from New Delhi
Sportswomen from Delhi
Racket sportspeople from Delhi
21st-century Indian women
21st-century Indian people
NC State Wolfpack women's tennis players